"Song for No One" is the 23rd single overall from Alphaville, and the second single from the band's 2010 album Catching Rays on Giant.

It was released digitally on 1 March and physically on 4 March 2011.

Track listing
 CD Single
 "Song for No One" – 3:31
 "Unplugged Medley" – 16:08
Carry on Your Flag
Big in Japan
Dance with Me

 Digital Download
 "Song for No One " – 3:31
 "Unplugged Medley" – 16:08
Carry on Your Flag
Big in Japan
Dance with Me

Chart performance
The single hit No. 50 in Germany.

References

2011 singles
Alphaville (band) songs
Songs written by Marian Gold
2010 songs